Alkino-2 (2-se Alkin) is a rural locality (a selo) in Chishminsky District, Bashkortostan, Russia. The population was 4,996 as of 2010. There are 15 streets.

Geography 
Alkino-2 is located 24 km northeast of Chishmy (the district's administrative centre) by road. Alkino is the nearest rural locality.

References 

Rural localities in Chishminsky District